Ana Boban (born 12 December 1947 in Split) is a former Croatian sports swimmer. She competed for the former Yugoslavia at the 1968 Summer Olympics in Mexico in the 100 metres freestyle and 4x100 metres medley relay events.

External links

1947 births
Living people
Croatian female swimmers
Olympic swimmers of Yugoslavia
Swimmers at the 1968 Summer Olympics
Sportspeople from Split, Croatia
Yugoslav female swimmers
Swimmers at the 1971 Mediterranean Games
Mediterranean Games gold medalists for Yugoslavia
Mediterranean Games medalists in swimming
20th-century Croatian women
21st-century Croatian women